Lount Meadows is a  biological Site of Special Scientific Interest south of Lount in Leicestershire, England.

This slightly acidic grassland site has hay meadows with diverse grass species. There are also areas of species-rich rough pasture, scrub and marsh, which is dominated by plicate sweet-grass and water horsetail.

The site is private land with no public access.

References

Sites of Special Scientific Interest in Leicestershire